Metopoplectus is a genus of beetles in the family Cerambycidae, containing the following species:

 Metopoplectus minor Gressitt, 1937
 Metopoplectus orientalis (Mitono, 1934)
 Metopoplectus similaris Gressitt, 1945
 Metopoplectus taiwanensis Gressitt, 1936

References

Agapanthiini